Soaru Range also known as Sewori Range is a mountain range in the Southern Highlands Province in central part of Papua New Guinea, 500 km north-west of Port Moresby is the nation's capitol.

Populated places within range include Wembu.

References

Mountain ranges of Papua New Guinea